The  CZW Ultraviolent Underground Championship was a professional hardcore wrestling championship owned by the Combat Zone Wrestling (CZW) promotion. The title was introduced on February 5, 2005 at CZW's Only the Strong event. It has since been retired after being unified with the CZW World Heavyweight Championship.

Overall, there have been 18 reigns shared among 12 wrestlers. Title reigns are determined either by professional wrestling matches between wrestlers involved in pre-existing scripted feuds and storylines, or by scripted circumstances. Wrestlers are portrayed as either villains or heroes as they follow a series of tension-building events, which culminate in a wrestling match or series of matches for the championship. Title changes happen mostly at CZW-promoted events, which are usually released on DVD. The inaugural champion was JC Bailey, who defeated Necro Butcher in a Backstage Ultraviolent Underground Barbed Wire Cage of Death Light Tubes Scaffold Death match on February 5, 2005 at CZW's Only the Strong event. Bailey, Brain Damage, Nick Gage, Danny Havoc and Drake Younger are all tied for the record of most reigns, with 2 each. At 379 days, Danny Havoc's first reign is the longest in the title's history. Younger's combined 2 reigns hold the record for most days as champion at 454. Sami Callihan's only reign holds the record for shortest reign at less than one day.

Title history

Combined reigns

Explanatory footnotes

References

General

Specific

External links
 CZWrestling.com

Combat Zone Wrestling championships
Hardcore wrestling championships
Unsanctioned championships